The Party for the Animals (PvdD) is a political party in the Netherlands. Among its main goals are animal rights and animal welfare.

Since 2019, the PvdD's political leader is Esther Ouwehand. With 3.8% of the votes at the 2021 general election, the PvdD holds six of the 150 House of Representatives's seats. In the Senate it has three of the 75 seats, it holds 26 States-Provincial seats across all provinces and in the European Parliament it has one of the 29 seats allocated to the Netherlands constituency.

History

Founding 
The Party for the Animals was founded on 28 October 2002 by Marianne Thieme, among others. Although initially considered a testimonial party, a party which does not seek to gain political power but to testify its beliefs and thereby influence other parties, the party signaled its willingness to enter a coalition-government in 2021. The party today is a part of the governing coalitions in the municipalities of Almere, Arnhem and Groningen.

In 2003 the PvdD competed in its first Tweede Kamer election. Founded only three months before the elections, the party competed in 18 of the 19 constituencies, missing ballot access in Overijssel due to a clerical error. The party won 47,665 votes, gaining 75% of the electoral threshold, but missing out on a seat.

Electoral breakthrough 
The electoral breakthrough for the PvdD occurred at the 2004 European elections. The party won 3.22% of the votes (153.432 votes), not enough to win a seat, but a sharp improvement compared to their 2003 result.  In 2006 the party won their first seats in the Tweede Kamer, with Marianne Thieme and Esther Ouwehand being elected to parliament. The party gained a lot of attention due to a number of prominent lijstduwers, such as Paul Cliteur, Maarten 't Hart, Kees van Kooten, Rudy Kousbroek, Georgina Verbaan and Jan Wolkers.

The Party won nine seats in eight provinces in the 2007 Dutch provincial elections, securing one seat in the Eerste Kamer. In 2010 the party won representation on the local councils of Amsterdam, Rotterdam, Utrecht, Arnhem, Gouda, Vlagtwedde and Pijnacker-Nootdorp, which meant that the PvdD secured representation on every level of government in the Netherlands.

In consequent elections the electoral support for the PvdD remained relatively stable, winning two seats in the Tweede Kamer in 2010 and 2012. In 2014 the party won representation to the European parliament and joined the European United Left-Nordic Green Left parliamentary group.

In 2017 the party gained its best result to date, winning five seats in the Tweede Kamer. On 16 July 2019 Femke Merel van Kooten split from the PvdD caucus and continued as an independent member of parliament. The reason for the split was that Van Kooten criticized the narrow political focus of the party, which in her opinion focused too much on ecology and animal rights.

Ouwehand leadership 
On 8 October 2019, founder and longtime leader Marianne Thieme retired from the leadership and the Tweede Kamer. Esther Ouwehand succeeded Thieme as parliamentary leader, and Eva van Esch replaced her as a member of parliament. She was previously a city council woman in Utrecht.

Allied organisations

PINK! 
PINK! is the youth wing of the PvdD. It was established on 12 September 2006, and has slightly over 2,000 members (2021 figure). The name is derived from the Dutch word for a cow that is older than a calf, but not yet fully mature. The current chairperson, Xenia Minnaert, was elected in 2020.

Nicolaas G. Pierson Foundation 
The Nicolaas G. Pierson Foundation is the research department of the PvdD. Founded in 2007, it is named after Niek Pierson, a Dutch economist and an early political donor of the party.

Animal Politics EU 
Initially founded as Euro Animal 7, Animal Politics EU is an informal grouping of animal rights based political parties within the European Union. Animal Politics EU has member parties in the Netherlands, Belgium, Cyprus, France, Germany, Italy, Portugal, Sweden and Spain. The group currently has two MEPs: Martin Buschmann for the Tierschutzpartei and Anja Hazekamp of the PvdD.

Electorate 
The electorate of the PvdD consists in majority of women (estimated at 70%) living in urban areas. In 2023 the party achieved its best results in Amsterdam (11.5%), Arnhem (8.8%), Bergen (8.3%), Haarlem (9.8%), Nijmegen (9.3%), Schiermonnikoog (9%) and Zutphen (8.7%). The party has lowest support in rural areas with large agricultural industries, such as in the Bible belt. It is supported by many organic farmers, and positions itself as a farmers party who wants to free farmers from the big agricultural companies and their lobbyists, and help farmers transition to organic farming. 

The PvdD has the largest proportion of vegan/vegetarian voters of any political party in the Netherlands, with 17.3% or 27.9% of PvdD voters in saying in 2 surveys in 2021 that they did not eat meat. The party with the second-highest proportion of vegan/vegetarian voters in both surveys was GroenLinks, for which the share laid at 8.4% or 16.9%.

Electoral results

House of Representatives

Senate

European Parliament

Provincial

Municipalities
At the 2022 Dutch municipal elections the PvdD won 63 seats, gaining representation in 29 municipalities. Party-wise, they have the most seats (4) in Leiden, Nijmegen and Groningen.

Representation

Members of the House of Representatives 
Current members of the House of Representatives, as of 2021:

 Esther Ouwehand, Parliamentary leader
 Lammert van Raan
 Frank Wassenberg, Secretary
 Eva van Esch
 Christine Teunissen
 Leonie Vestering

Members of the Senate 
Current members of the Senate since the Senate election of 2019:

 Niko Koffeman, Parliamentary leader
 Peter Nicolaï
 Henriëtte Prast

Members of the European Parliament 

Current members of the European Parliament since the European Parliamentary election of 2019:

 Anja Hazekamp, Leader

The MEPs of the Party for the Animals are part of the European United Left–Nordic Green Left Group in the European parliament.

See also 
List of animal advocacy parties

References

External links 

 
Animal advocacy parties
Animal welfare organisations based in the Netherlands
Political parties established in 2002
Political parties in the Netherlands
2002 establishments in the Netherlands
Parties represented in the European Parliament
Organisations based in Amsterdam